The Nenmara Vallanghy Vela or Nenmara Vela is one of the most popular annual festival of Kerala celebrated at Nellikulangara Bhagavathy temple in Nenmara, Palakkad district.

Nemmara and Vallanghy are two neighbouring villages in the south part of Palakkad district, which is in the valley of Nelliyampathi hills. The green carpet of paddy field will turn to the festival ground in the first week of April. The festival falls on 20th of 'Meenam' according to the Malayalam Calendar (2nd or 3rd of every April). The 'Kodiyettam' (starting) will be celebrated on 'meenam 1st' every year. The celebration continues for the first 20 days of 'meenam', and on 20th day the Vela festival will be celebrated. The annual Vela festival, celebrated by Nemmara and Vallangi villages after the paddy harvest, is famous for its display of fireworks and caparisoned elephants.

This is the Festival of Colours, Art forms, Firework, Elephants. Panchavadyam, Pandi Melam are the cultural arts forms of Kerala which performed here with its best players of the state. Each desom will make large infrastructure called 'anapanthal', using bamboo and wood and will electrified using small bulbs which makes more beauty to the festival. The finest elephants of Kerala will join in the procession in two sides. The caparisoned elephants from two desoms will come to Nellikulangara temple to meet Nellikulangara Bhagavathy. The firework is one of the major attraction of the festival, which is considered best among other festivals in Kerala. The fireworks are so loud that it is called as Asia's loudest firework, arguably in the whole world.

This festival is like a competition between the two desoms Vallanghy and Nemmara, and that makes the spirit of Vela festival. The people from different states and also from other countries are coming here to enjoy the fantasy of the festival.

Gallery

See also
 Thrissur Pooram, a similar festival

References

External links 

 https://www.keralatourism.org/event/nemmara-vallangi-vela/14

Hindu festivals in Kerala
Festivals in Palakkad district
April observances